"Home of the Brave" is the ending phrase from the United States national anthem "The Star-Spangled Banner". It may refer to:

Film
 Home of the Brave (1949 film), a film directed by Mark Robson
 Home of the Brave (1985 film), a documentary directed by Helena Solberg 
 Home of the Brave (1986 film), a concert film featuring and directed by Laurie Anderson
 "Home of the Brave", a season eight episode of TV series Walker, Texas Ranger
 Home of the Brave (2004 film), a documentary directed by Paola di Florio  
 Home of the Brave (2006 film), a film starring Samuel L. Jackson, 50 Cent, and Billy Michael

Music
 Home of the Brave, a 1965 album by Jody Miller
 "Home of the Brave", a song from the album
 Home of the Brave, a 1994 album by folk rock band Black 47
 Home of the Brave (soundtrack), a soundtrack album for the 1986 film of same name
 "Home of the Brave", a song by Lou Reed from the album Legendary Hearts
 "Home of the Brave", a song by The Nails from the 1984 album Mood Swing
 "Home of the Brave", a song by Spiritualized from the album Ladies and Gentlemen We Are Floating in Space
 "Home of the Brave", a song by Gigolo Aunts from the album Tales from the Vinegar Side
 "Home of the Brave", a song by Toto from the album The Seventh One
 "Home of the Brave", a song by White Ring from the 2018 album Gate of Grief
 "This Is the Home of the Brave", the national anthem of the Islamic Emirate of Afghanistan

Other uses
 Home of the Brave (play), a play by Arthur Laurents
 Home of the Brave (radio program), an American radio program broadcast on CBS